The 3DBenchy is a 3D computer model specifically designed for testing the accuracy and capabilities of 3D printers. The 3DBenchy is described by its creator, Creative Tools, as "the jolly 3D printing torture-test" and was released (STL only) in April 2015, with a multi-part, multi-color model released in July 2015.  

While the model is free to download, use, and redistribute with attribution, it is not open source, as the authors have not released the source code, and do not allow modifications.  Due to its status as a common benchmark, it is believed to be the world's most 3D printed object. The model itself is a tugboat design, and actually floats in water given the right conditions in printing.

Gallery

See also 
 Standard test image
 Stanford bunny
 Utah teapot
 Suzanne (3D model)

References

External links
 
 Download 3DBenchy
 3DBenchy Thingiverse Page
DIY culture
Computing output devices
Engineering projects
3D graphics models
Test items
Fused filament fabrication
3D printing
Boats